The following is a list of Japanese musical groups. This includes a list of bands and idol groups, organized by year of debut.

1990s

2000s

2010s

2020s

See also 
 Japanese idol
 J-pop
 Japanese rock
 List of musical artists from Japan
 List of J-pop artists
 List of Japanese rock music groups

References 

Japanese music